Independent Group of the Condado de Treviño (AECT) is a municipal political party in Condado de Treviño (Castille and León, Spain) created in 1991.

Ideology and goals 
The party supports an integration of the Enclave of Treviño in Álava and therefore in the Basque Country. The main arguments in favor of integration are the will of most of the treviñeses, and the problems that the Enclave of Treviño suffers due to its isolation from the rest of the Province of Burgos, especially in the area of public services.

Election results 
AECT governed the municipality between 1999 and 2007.

References

External links 
 

Political parties in Castile and León
Political parties established in 1991
1991 establishments in Spain